Michelle Triola (November 13, 1932 – October 30, 2009) was an American actress notable for unsuccessfully suing actor Lee Marvin in 1977, having cohabited with him from 1965 to 1970. The trial, which brought about the concept of palimony, was widely covered in the media at the time. During this time, she was Michelle Triola Marvin, having legally changed her name to add Marvin's surname to her own. She was represented by attorney Marvin Mitchelson.

Personal life and career 
Triola was born in Los Angeles. She never had children. She lived with actor Dick Van Dyke from 1976 until her death in 2009.

Triola was married to actor Skip Ward for six months from November 1961 to June 1962.

Triola majored in theater arts at UCLA. She was a lounge singer and dancer. She danced in the original 1958 Broadway production of Flower Drum Song, directed by Gene Kelly. Her film acting career consisted of minor roles, including a stand-in in Lee Marvin's 1965 film Ship of Fools and a guest role on the Dick Van Dyke television series Diagnosis: Murder.

Suing Lee Marvin 
Although she and Marvin never married, Triola sought financial compensation similar to that available to spouses under California's alimony and community property laws. The result was the landmark case Marvin v Marvin, 18 Cal. 3d 660 (1976). The Supreme Court of California held that Triola could proceed with her suit, as it did state a cause of action and the trial court erred in granting judgment to Marvin on the pleadings.

The case went to trial. On April 18, 1979, Judge Arthur K. Marshall ordered Marvin to pay $104,000 to Triola for "rehabilitation purposes", but denied her community property claim for one half of the $3.6 million which Marvin had earned during their six years of cohabitation. Both sides claimed victory, but in August 1981, the California Court of Appeal ruled that Triola could not show any contract between her and Marvin to justify any payment to her. As a result, Triola received no money from Marvin.

Death 
In April 2008, she underwent surgery for lung cancer. The cancer caused her death on October 30, 2009, at the home she shared with Van Dyke. She was 76 years old.

References

External links 
 
 

1932 births
2009 deaths
20th-century American actresses
American film actresses
American television actresses
Deaths from lung cancer in California
People from Greater Los Angeles
UCLA Henry Samueli School of Engineering and Applied Science alumni
Burials at Forest Lawn Memorial Park (Hollywood Hills)
20th-century American singers
20th-century American women singers
21st-century American women